George Washington Pilipō (February 22, 1828 – March 27, 1887) was a politician of the Kingdom of Hawaii. He served as a member of the House of Representative from North Kona (1860–1884) and Reverend of Kaumakapili Church. Considered one of the leading Hawaiian politicians of his generation, he was known as "Ka Liona o Kona Akau", or  "The Lion of North Kona".

Early life 
Pilipō was born, on February 22, 1828, in Holualoa, North Kona, on the island of Hawaii. He had eleven siblings but only himself and another sibling survived to maturity. He was educated at the Hilo Boarding School and Lahainaluna School. After graduating in 1857, he worked as teacher and established a school in his home district for a time. One of his pupils was George W. Kanuha, who translated Jules Verne's Twenty Thousand Leagues Under the Sea into the Hawaiian language. 

Pilipō was ordained in 1864 at the Mokuaikaua Church at Kailua-Kona and worked there for seven years as the assistant of Reverend Asa Thurston, who came to Hawaii with the first company of ABCFM missionaries in 1820. In 1871, he was appointed the pastor of Kaumakapili Church, the church for common people in Honolulu, succeeding Reverend Anderson Oliver Forbes. He served as a pastor until 1874 when he was succeeded by Moses Kuaea.

Political career 
Between 1860 and 1884, Pilipō was elected to serve as the House for his district in North Kona with a few non-consecutive gaps. He sat in on the legislative assemblies of 1860, 1868, 1870, 1876, 1878, 1880, 1882, and 1884. In his long political career, Pilipō served under the reigns of four monarchs: Kamehameha IV and Kamehameha V, Lunalilo and Kalākaua. During the 1874 election, following the death of Lunalilo, Pilipō, although not serving on the legislature at the time, actively supported and campaigned for the candidacy of Queen Emma of Hawaii against Kalākaua. He was suspected of being involved with the 1874 Honolulu Courthouse riot which occurred after Emma's defeat.

After the controversial election, Pilipō became a member of the Queen Emma Party and joined with Representative Joseph Nāwahī of Hilo in forming the native opposition against Kalākaua. In 1876, he and Nāwahī led the opposition to the Reciprocity Treaty of 1875, which they as a step towards American annexation and only beneficial to the elite number of Euro-American businessmen at the expense of Native Hawaiian subsistence farmers. He was influential in bringing down the appointment of the Italian adventurer Celso Caesar Moreno as a cabinet minister in 1880. In the election of 1886, Kalākaua personally journeyed to the districts of Pilipō and Nāwahī, on Hawaii, and John William Kalua, on Maui, to sway the vote against these three politicians. This resulted in the electoral defeat of Pilipō in his home district of Kona. 

According to the later testimony of Charles T. Gulick in the Blount Report, Pilipō and his contemporary Luther Aholo were considered "some of the brightest [native leaders] then living ... in the house". His prowess as a politician gained him the epithet of "Ka Liona o Kona Akau",  "The Lion of North Kona". Pilipō and Nāwahī were given the moniker of "Nā Pū Kuni Ahi o ka ʻAhaʻōlelo" (the Cannons of the Legislature) for their steadfast defense of Hawaiian sovereignty.

Death 
Pilipō died on March 27, 1887, at his residence in the Pālama neighborhood of Honolulu. The cause of death was brain fever; he was fifty-nine years old. He was buried from the Kaumakapili Church and a memorial service was held at Kawaiahaʻo Church.
Joseph Oliver Carter, who later became the personal secretary of Queen Liliuokalani, praised Pilipō as "one of the Hawaii's truest and stanchest friends."

References

Bibliography

1828 births
1887 deaths
Native Hawaiian politicians
Hawaiian Kingdom politicians
People from Hawaii (island)
Members of the Hawaiian Kingdom House of Representatives
19th-century Congregationalist ministers
Hawaiian Kingdom Protestants
Hilo Boarding School alumni
Lahainaluna School alumni